Michael Ryan Rupp (born January 13, 1980) is an American former professional ice hockey center. He has previously played in the National Hockey League (NHL) for the New Jersey Devils, Phoenix Coyotes, Columbus Blue Jackets, Pittsburgh Penguins,New York Rangers and Minnesota Wild.

Rupp scored the Stanley Cup-clinching goal — and first Stanley Cup playoff goal of his career — in the 2003 Stanley Cup Finals, which gave the Devils franchise its third Cup championship. Rupp currently serves as an analyst on NHL Network and AT&T SportsNet Pittsburgh. He serves as a co Host of That's Hockey Talk with Nick Maraldo and Kyle “Gumpy” Cathcart which comes out of the Pat McAfee Incorporated Studios.

Playing career
Rupp played high school hockey at St. Edward High School in Lakewood, Ohio.  He was originally drafted in the first round, ninth overall, by the New York Islanders in the 1998 NHL Entry Draft. After remaining unsigned while still playing in the Ontario Hockey League (OHL) with the Erie Otters, however, Rupp opted to return to the NHL Entry Draft and was subsequently selected 76th overall in 2000 by the New Jersey Devils.

Rupp played his first professional season in 2000–01 with the Albany River Rats of the American Hockey League (AHL), the top minor league affiliate of the Devils. He later made his NHL debut January 13, 2003 with the Devils, where he helped the team win the Stanley Cup after scoring the Cup-clinching goal. Rupp is the only player in Stanley Cup history to have his first playoff goal be the Stanley Cup winning goal.

The following season, in 2003–04, Rupp was traded by the Devils, along with a second-round draft pick, to the Phoenix Coyotes in exchange for Jan Hrdina on March 5, 2004. After the 2004–05 NHL lockout, Rupp was traded with Jason Chimera and Cale Hulse to the Columbus Blue Jackets in exchange for Geoff Sanderson and Tim Jackman on October 8, 2005. Columbus declined to submit Rupp, a restricted free agent, a qualifying offer in June 2006.

On July 9, 2006, Rupp signed a one-year, $450,000 contract to return to the New Jersey Devils. After a successful season establishing himself as a gritty hardworking player, Rupp re-signed with the Devils on June 28, 2007, to a two-year contract.

On July 1, 2009, Rupp signed a two-year, $1.65 million contract with the Pittsburgh Penguins. While scoring his first career hat-trick on November 30, 2009, against the New York Rangers, Rupp scored his sixth, seventh, and eighth goals for a new career-high just 28 games into the 2009–10 season.

On July 1, 2011, Rupp signed a three-year, $4.5 million contract with the New York Rangers. He scored two goals in the 2012 Winter Classic against the Philadelphia Flyers to help the Rangers prevail 3–2. After Rupp scored his first goal, he saluted the crowd in a similar, yet mocking, fashion to how then-Flyer Jaromír Jágr celebrates a goal; the mocking gesture immediately led to a retaliatory confrontation initiated by Philadelphia forward Scott Hartnell.

During the lockout-shortened, 48-game 2012–13 season, on February 4, 2013, Rupp was traded to the Minnesota Wild in exchange for forwards Darroll Powe and Nick Palmieri.

On April 11, 2014, Rupp was suspended by the NHL for four games without pay for a "late illegal check to the head" of St. Louis Blues forward T. J. Oshie.

Broadcasting career
Since retiring in 2014, Rupp serves as both a studio analyst for the NHL Network, and a post-game analyst on Pittsburgh Penguins games for AT&T SportsNet Pittsburgh.

In addition to NHL Network, Rupp is a co-host of That’s Hockey Talk, of Pat McAfee Inc. alongside Nick Maraldo and Kyle “Gumpy (Gump)” Cathcart.

Personal life
Rupp's childhood ice hockey teams included the Parma Heights Wings Municipal Hockey Club, where he started playing at age nine. He attended and played for St. Edward High School, a catholic college preparatory school in Lakewood, Ohio. In just two years playing for the varsity squad at St. Edward, the team won two state championships in 1995 and 1996. After winning the Stanley Cup with the Devils, Rupp traveled to SouthPark Mall in Strongsville, Ohio, to display the Cup and sign autographs for fans in his home state.

Career statistics

Regular season and playoffs

Awards and honors

References

External links

1980 births
Albany River Rats players
American men's ice hockey left wingers
Columbus Blue Jackets players
Danbury Trashers players
Erie Otters players
Ice hockey people from Cleveland
Iowa Wild players
Living people
Minnesota Wild players
National Hockey League first-round draft picks
New Jersey Devils draft picks
New Jersey Devils players
New York Islanders draft picks
New York Rangers players
Phoenix Coyotes players
Pittsburgh Penguins players
St. Edward High School (Lakewood, Ohio) alumni
Stanley Cup champions
Syracuse Crunch players
Windsor Spitfires players